Rhachistia catenata is a species of air-breathing land snail, a pulmonate gastropod mollusk in the family Cerastidae. It was subsequently re-described as Buliminus (Rhachis) braunsii in 1869 when found in Zanzibar.

Description

Distribution 
This species occurs in Africa. The type locality is contained in Mozambique.

References 

Cerastidae